Robert Normoyle (2 August 1866 – 12 June 1933) was an Irish Gaelic footballer. His career with the Limerick senior team spanned the early years of the championship.

References

1866 births
1933 deaths
Commercials (Limerick) Gaelic footballers
Limerick inter-county Gaelic footballers